Cache Valley is a valley of northern Utah and southeast Idaho, United States, that includes the Logan metropolitan area. The valley was used by 19th century mountain men and was the site of the 1863 Bear River Massacre. The name, Cache Valley is often used synonymously to describe the Logan Metropolitan Area, one of the fastest growing metro areas in the US per capita — both in terms of economic GDP and population.

History

Alongside habitation by the Shoshone and other indigenous peoples, European explorer Michel Bourdon discovered Cache Valley 1818 during a MacKenzie fur expedition.  The valley was subsequently used for the second of the annual gatherings of mountain men. Many of the trappers who worked in the valley came from the Hudson's Bay Company, the Northwest Fur Company, and the Rocky Mountain Fur Company. The name "Cache Valley" was derived by the fur trappers who hid their trading goods in caches in that region. The use of caches was a method used by fur traders to protect their goods from theft and damage.

Mormon William Gardner became the first Anglo-American permanent settler in 1852. Prior to the Mormon selection of the Salt Lake Valley, Jim Bridger had recommended Cache Valley due to its relative abundance of fresh water.  A Mormon settler group led by Peter Maughan arrived via Box Elder Canyon (commonly referred to as Sardine Canyon) in July 1856 and additional settlers arrived on September 15.

Early Anglo-American settlers of Cache Valley were able to defend themselves from the threat of Native Americans by creating the Cache Valley Militia. Men from the various towns in Cache Valley nicknamed "minute men" volunteered to drill, serve as watchmen, and to ride to the aid of other communities at the news of attacks and skirmishes.

On January 29, 1863, an expedition from Camp Douglas, Utah to Cache Valley, the United States Army at the request of Cache Valley settlers attacked a Shoshone village in the early morning at the confluence of the Bear River and Beaver Creek (now Battle Creek) in what became known as the Bear River Massacre. Officially, numbers of Shoshone dead have varied, but estimates settle around 400-500 dead, including hundreds of women and children. This is still the largest massacre of Native American peoples by the United States government today.

Communities

Cache County Communities:

 Amalga
 Avon
 Benson
 Cache Junction
 Clarkston
 College Ward
 Cornish
 Cove
 Hyde Park
 Hyrum
 Lewiston
 Logan
 Mendon
 Millville
 Mt. Sterling
 Newton
 Nibley
 North Logan
 Paradise
 Petersboro
 Providence
 Richmond
 River Heights
 Smithfield
 Trenton
 Wellsville
 Young Ward

Franklin County Communities:

 Banida
 Clifton
 Cub River
 Dayton
 Egypt
 Fairview
 Franklin
 Glendale
 Mapleton
 Oxford
 Preston
 Riverdale
 Thatcher
 Treasureton
 Weston
 Whitney

Transportation

U.S. Highways 89 and 91 enter the valley from the southwest as one highway, and then separate in downtown Logan. US-89 goes northeast into Logan Canyon, and thence to Bear Lake, a large lake in the area. US-91 goes due northward into Idaho and to reconnect with I-15. Several state highways run through the valley: In Idaho, State Highways 34 and 36; and in Utah, SR-23, SR-30, SR-101, SR-142, SR-165, SR-200, and SR-218.

The valley is served by the Cache Valley Transit District (CVTD), a zero-fare bus system. CVTD primarily serves the Logan area however offers shuttle service to Preston.

There are two airports in the valley, the Logan-Cache Airport and Preston Airport. Neither airport provides commercial service, however Salt Lake City International Airport is within driving distance (less than 2 hours).

See also

 List of valleys of Utah

References

External links

Bear River (Great Salt Lake)
Landforms of Cache County, Utah
Landforms of Franklin County, Idaho
Valleys of Idaho
Valleys of Utah